Stockport College is a medium-sized educational institute in Stockport, Greater Manchester, England, providing further education and higher education to those aged 16 and over. It provides educational opportunities for the community including; school leavers, adults, and businesses.

The college has academic and vocational courses from pre-GCSE to degree level. It is a major provider of post-16 education and training in Stockport and a centre for a range of specialist courses.

Amongst its facilities the college has a theatre where drama and performing arts is taught; it is named the Peter Barkworth Theatre after the English film and television actor Peter Barkworth.

Under the new merger with Trafford College, Lesley Davies is the new principal and chief executive of the Trafford College Group. James Scott is the current Stockport College campus principal.

Town centre campus
The town centre campus is the original site of Stockport College of Further and Higher Education and much of the campus dates back to the 1960s. The complete redevelopment of this site and some surrounding buildings was due for completion in 2011 to create a flagship educational campus for the Metropolitan Borough of Stockport. The total project value was estimated at around £100m from various sources. It included the closure and selling off of the Heaton Moor Campus, inherited from the merger with North Area College in 2006. Under the new college merger, investment is being made in key areas to Stockport College. One such area is the plan to redevelop the Stockport College campus. A new town centre campus redevelopment project is set to begin in 2018.

Trafford College Group
Stockport College and Trafford College announced on 4 April 2018 the completion of their merger. The Trafford College Group is the corporation name for the new provider which will have over 14,000 students and apprentices and a combined turnover of around £37 million.

Stockport College and Trafford College will retain their existing names and campus sites.

Notable people

 Adam Gillen - British actor known for Benidorm (TV series)
 Sarah Harding - was an English singer-songwriter, dancer, model, and actress and is associated with the girl pop group Girls Aloud
 Alan Lowndes - was a British painter known primarily for his scenes of northern life
 Luthfur Rahman –  Labour politician, councillor on Manchester City Council and executive member for skills, culture and leisure on Manchester City Council
 Angela Rayner - Labour politician (Member of Parliament), former care worker and trade unionist 
 Daniel Rigby - BAFTA award-winning Actor

See also

Listed buildings in Stockport

References

External links
Stockport College web site

Buildings and structures in Stockport
Education in the Metropolitan Borough of Stockport
Further education colleges in Greater Manchester
Learning and Skills Beacons
Educational institutions established in 2006
2006 establishments in England